Robert Glen Bourne (born June 21, 1954) is a Canadian former professional ice hockey centre who played for the New York Islanders and the Los Angeles Kings of the National Hockey League (NHL) between 1974 and 1988. He was a four-time Stanley Cup winner and 1984 Canada Cup champion. He was inducted into the New York Islanders Hall of Fame.

Baseball career
Bourne was a skilled baseball player and signed with Major League Baseball's Houston Astros. He played one season for the Appalachian League Covington Astros in 1972 where he platooned at first base with future Hockey Hall of Famer Clark Gillies. Both left professional baseball after the season to focus on professional hockey.

Playing career
Bourne was drafted 38th overall by the Kansas City Scouts in the 1974 NHL amateur draft, though he would never play for the organization. On September 13, 1974, he was traded to the Islanders for Bart Crashley and the rights to Larry Hornung.

Bourne spent the entire 1974–75 season with the Islanders, but found himself in the minor leagues the following year. He returned to the Islanders for the 1976–77 season, and spent the next ten seasons on Long Island, recording at least thirty goals three times and between twenty and thirty goals three others. Known as "one of the fastest and most gifted skaters" in the league, he won the Stanley Cup four consecutive times — 1980, 1981, 1982, 1983. He led the Islanders in playoff scoring en route to their fourth Stanley Cup in 1983.

In 1980-81, he scored a career-high 35 goals and 76 points. He also played in the 33rd National Hockey League All-Star Game in Los Angeles in February 1981.

Bourne's career ended on a high note. He was claimed by the Los Angeles Kings on waivers in October 1986 and played two seasons with the Kings. In Bourne's final year in the NHL, he was awarded the Bill Masterton Trophy for perseverance. He was also honored by Sports Illustrated as one of several Sportsmen of the Year in 1987, as one of eight "Athletes Who Care" for their work in humanitarian causes. Bourne was singled out for his work with a school for disabled children.

Coaching career
After retiring as a player, Bourne served as a coach for several minor league teams, including the Central Texas Stampede, Las Vegas Thunder and Utah Grizzlies. He now hosts the Hockey Greats Fantasy Camp  in Kelowna, British Columbia.

Accolades
Bourne was honored as the ninth member of the New York Islanders Hall of Fame on November 25, 2006. Though Bourne's number fourteen is not retired, he has joined the eight team members—six players, one coach and one general manager—whose numbers have been retired in the Islanders Hall. The other members are Denis Potvin, Mike Bossy, Billy Smith, Bryan Trottier, Clark Gillies, Bob Nystrom, Bill Torrey and Al Arbour. A banner commemorating Bourne's induction hangs in the Nassau Coliseum.

Personal life
Bourne's son Justin is also a former professional hockey player who played 16 games in the American Hockey League. Justin is now a senior hockey analyst with Sportsnet NHL after serving two years as a video coach with the Toronto Marlies of the American Hockey League. Justin is married to Brianna, the daughter of Bob's former teammate, Clark Gillies.

Career statistics

Regular season and playoffs

International

References

External links
 
 

1954 births
Living people
Bill Masterton Memorial Trophy winners
Canadian ice hockey centres
Covington Astros players
Fort Worth Texans players
Ice hockey people from Saskatchewan
Indianapolis Racers draft picks
Kansas City Scouts draft picks
Los Angeles Kings players
New York Islanders players
Saskatoon Blades players
Stanley Cup champions